The Tour de Peninsula (TdP) is a 3, 22, 33, and 65-mile non-competitive bicycle ride that begins and ends at Coyote Point Park in San Mateo, California.

Founded in 1995 by Mark Simon and Rick Sutton, the Tour de Peninsula took place every summer from 1995 until 2007. For many years the event was managed by Rohdyco. In 2008 the owners, San Mateo County Parks & Recreation Foundation, did not hold it, but in 2009 the ride resumed with Sutton once again an event director.

The Tour de Peninsula draws more than 2,000 cyclists and benefits the San Mateo County Parks & Recreation Foundation through cyclist entrance fees. Participants receive support along the ride route with water and snacks at rest stops staffed by volunteers, and a Tour de Peninsula "Dirty Shirt" (a T-shirt with fake mud spots on it) when they finish the ride.

While the ride takes place, family members who are not on bicycles enjoy a day in the park at Coyote Point Park where there is a spacious picnic area with inflatable children's games, and an exposition of event sponsors as well as small vendors. Post-ride activities include live music.

The names "Tour de Peninsula" and "Dirty Shirt" are light-hearted references to the competitive Tour de France and its Yellow Jersey, in order to stress the uncompetitive nature of the ride.

References

External links 
2007 Tour de Peninsula
San Mateo County Parks & Recreation Foundation

Cycling in California
Recurring sporting events established in 1995